Andrey Kolganov (born 27 September 1974) is a Kazakhstani fencer. He competed in the individual foil event at the 2000 Summer Olympics.

References

1974 births
Living people
Russian male foil fencers
Kazakhstani male foil fencers
Olympic fencers of Kazakhstan
Fencers at the 2000 Summer Olympics